Ana Sokolovic (born 1968) is a Canadian music composer based in Montreal, Quebec, whose contemporary pieces have won several awards in Canada.

Career 

Sokolovic studied composition under Dušan Radić at the University of Novi Sad and Zoran Erić at the University of Arts in Belgrade. She received her masters in composition from the Université de Montréal studying under José Evangelista.

Sokolovic's repertoire is wide, covering theatrical, chamber, operatic, orchestral, and vocal genres.

The Société de musique contemporaine du Québec (SMCQ) dedicated the "Hommage Series" to Sokolovic for the 2011–2012 season, marking the twenty years since she immigrated to Quebec. Her body of work was celebrated in 200 events taking place across Canada.

Sokolovic's opera, Svadba-Wedding, focused on the day before a Serbian wedding and was produced by the Queen of Puddings Music Theater. The production toured Canada and Europe from 2012 until 2015, as well as returning in March 2018 for a performance at the Opera de Montreal.

In 2015, she became the first woman composer to create an operatic work for the Canadian Opera Company. The commission in question is regarding The Old Fools by renowned English poet Philip Larkin, a libretto written by British librettist Paul Bentley.

Her composition "Ringelspiel" was performed by the Montreal Symphony Orchestra in November 2017. Her music has also been performed at London's Royal Opera House and Montreal's Conservatory of Music.

In 2021 she created the symphonic short film Iskra, an exploration of the impact of technology on human society, for the National Arts Centre/CBC Gem series Undisrupted.

Awards 

 SOCAN Foundation Award for Young Composers, 1995, 1996, 1997
 Grand prize and 1st prize in the Chamber Music category, CBC Young Composers Competition, 1999
 Joseph S. Stauffer Prize, Canada Council for the Arts, 2005
 Prix Opus for Composer of the Year, Conseil québécois de la musique, 2007
 Jan V. Matejcek Award, SOCAN, 2008, 2012
 National Arts Centre Award, 2009
 Dora Mavor Moore Award for Outstanding New Musical/Opera, 2012
 Juno Award for Classical Composition of the Year, 2019, for Golden Slumbers Kiss Your Eyes

Sokolovic is also a nominee for the Juno Awards of 2017 in the category Classical Composition of the Year. The nominated work is entitled "And I need a room to receive five thousand people with raised glasses... or... what a glorious day, the birds are singing "halleluia".

Education 

Born in Serbia, Sokolovic was a student of classical ballet prior to studying theater and music. She studied composition in Belgrade and later obtained a master's degree from Université de Montréal where she now teaches. Sokolovic immigrated to Quebec, Canada as a young adult.

References 

Canadian classical composers
Women classical composers
21st-century classical composers
Canadian opera composers
Women opera composers
Living people
Musicians from Montreal
Canadian people of Serbian descent
Serbian emigrants to Canada
Serbian composers
1968 births
21st-century women composers
Juno Award for Classical Composition of the Year winners
Canadian women composers
21st-century Canadian women musicians
21st-century Canadian composers